Vāsishka (Bactrian: BAZHÞKO Bazēško; Middle Brahmi  , ; Kharosthi: 𐨬𐨗𐨿𐨱𐨅𐨮𐨿𐨐 , ; ruled c. 247–265 CE) was a Kushan emperor, who seems to have had a short reign following Kanishka II.

Rule
The rule of Vāsishka in the area of Punjab is attested by inscriptions, as well as in the area of Mathura (Isapur inscription). His rule is recorded as far south as Sanchi, where one and possibly another inscription in his name have been found, dated to the year 22 (The Sanchi inscription of "Vaskushana"-i.e. Vasishka Kushana) and year 28 (The Sanchi inscription of Vasaska-i.e. Vasishka) of a Kushan era (widely thought to be the second century of the Kanishka era). This would place his reign c. 247–265.

Inscriptions and statuary
Vasishka appears in four known inscriptions, including a Kharoshti inscription in the Indus region.

Sanchi Bodhisattava
Several statues or statue fragments from the art of Mathura with the name of Vasishka have been found on the site of Sanchi. One of them is a statue of a seated Bodhisattva, dated to "Year 28 of Vasishka". The inscription reads:

Sanchi pedestal
Another Mathura fragment found in Sanchi is the pedestal of a statue of a standing Buddha. The inscription is inscribed with "Year 22 of Vaskushana", thought to be possibly "Vasishka Kushana". Worshippers in long tunics with belts typical of the Kushan style can be seen standing around a seated Boddhisattva. The inscription reads:

Ara inscription
Vāsishka appears in the "Ara inscription" of Kanishka III, found in the Indus region, not far south of Attock. In this inscription, he is presented as the father of Kanishka, thought to be Kanishka III, and his name appears in Kharoshthi as "Vajeshka".

Isapur inscription of Vasishka, Year 24
An inscription in the name of Vasishka in pure Sanskrit in Middle Brahmi script, with his full imperial titles Mahārājasya rājātirājāsya devaputrasya Shāhe Vvāsishkasya ("Of the Great King, the King of kings, His Majesty, Shahi Vasishka") was found in Isapur, near the city of Mathura, on the shaft of a "Yupa", a sacrificial Brahmanical pillar, now in the Mathura Museum.

Coinage

The coinage of Vasishka became smaller than his predecessors, being minted on increasingly small flans, and the metal quality becoming debased. The deities appearing on the reverse of his coinage are similar to those in the coins of Huvishka and Vasudeva I.

Several of Vāsishka's coins have been found together with those of the Kushano-Sasanian ruler Ardashir I Kushanshah, suggesting a level of rivalry and interaction between the two rulers.

The coins of Vasishka usually have the legend in Greco-Bactrian script þAONANOþAO BAZIþKO KOþANO "King of King Bazeshko Kushano".

Some coins with a slightly different name (Obverse legend þAONANOþAO BAZOΔΗO/BOZOΗO KOþANO "King of King Bazodeo the Kushan") have been attributed to  "Vaskushana", generally equaled with Vasishka himself.

References
 "Ancient Indian Inscriptions", S. R. Goyal, 2005
"From Persepolis to the Punjab:  Exploring Ancient Iran, Afghanistan and Pakistan", Elizabeth Errington and Vesta Sarkhosh Curtis, 2007.
The Crossroads of Asia:  Transformation in Image and Symbol", Elizabeth Errington and Joe Cribb, 1992.

References

External links
 Online catalogue of coins of Vasishka

3rd-century Indian monarchs
Kushan emperors